One Day Like This may refer to:

"One Day Like This" (song), by Elbow, 2008
One Day Like This (album), by Rhydian Roberts, 2014